Cattleya warscewiczii (The "Warscewicz's Cattley's orchid"), a labiate Cattleya, is a species of orchid.   It was first collected by Józef Warszewicz in Colombia in 1848-49 and formally described by Heinrich Gustav Reichenbach in 1855. C. warscewiczii exhibits a typical Cattleya sympodial habit. Pseudobulbs are 8-16" (20-40 cm) long, unifoliate, cylindrical or cigar-shaped, grooved. Flowers are 7-11" (17.5-27.5 cm) across, largest in the genus, showy, fragrant. In culture the flowering is in summer on that year's spring growth. Strong light and good air movement are required.

The diploid chromosome number of C. warscewiczii has been determined as 2n = 40; the haploid chromosome number as n = 20.

C. warscewiczii hybridizes naturally with C. aurea / dowiana, producing C. x hardyana. C. warscewiczii has also been used extensively in Cattleya hybridization, to produce large-flowered hybrid Cattleyas.

Notes

References

External links

warscewiczii
warscewiczii